Pricesearcher was an independent e-commerce search engine launched in the UK in 2016 which now focussing on top 10 lists and providing lists based on sales with no price comparison functionality  . It does not use the traditional Price Comparison Website (PCW) model adopted by comparison sites such as Moneysupermarket.com and search engines such as Google Shopping where retailers pay to list their products for sale. Since its inception, it has listed products from online retailers, without charging a listing fee or commission for sales. Product search results are consequently unaffected by a retailer's marketing budget or lack thereof. Shoppers are able to use the vertical search engine as a price-checking tool, to see whether the goods they find 'on sale' elsewhere are genuinely a good deal.

History 
Pricesearcher began as a small, self-funded project by Samuel Dean in 2011, with the aim of indexing all products available to buy online to give shoppers a clear picture.

Dean used Peopleperhour in the early days to find freelancers to work on the initial project. Then in 2014, he recruited Raja Akhtar, a PHP specialist, and the two worked together in their spare time. Akhtar is now Head of Web Development at Pricesearcher. In 2015, they recruited a freelance DevOps engineer, Vlassios Rizopoulos, to help speed up the product indexing process. In 2017, Rizopoulos became Pricesearcher's Chief Technology Officer.

Their goal was to list a searched-for item in one view, from retailers, marketplaces, classified advertising sites, brands and shopping comparison sites. As the product index increased, funding was sought. In 2016, Pricesearcher was launched and received its first outside seed funding from private investors.

Retailers who joined the Pricesearcher search engine in their first year were Amazon, Argos, IKEA, Mothercare, Currys, PC World, Dreams (bed retailer), Wilko, King of Shaves, JD Sports. Many more have joined since.

In September 2018, Pricesearcher was selected to join the London Stock Exchange's capital-raising programme.

In October 2018, former Amazon UK Head of Pricing Weldon W. Whitener joined Pricesearcher as Chief Analytics officer.

In January 2019, Pricesearcher becomes a Google CSS Partner (Comparison Shopping Services)

In March 2019, Pi Datametrics and Pricesearcher Launched a Joint product for digital retailers "The first ever combining of organic search data and online product price data in a single report, PricePoint allows retailers to highlight where the winning pricing opportunities exist online, alongside organic visibility."

Pricesearcher enters a new partnership with latestdeals.co.uk where their technology is powering product search and product comparison for their consumers. Latestdeals.co.uk is a uk website dedicated to the promotion of deals, vouchers, and freebies.

Pricesearcher Ltd went into administration on 12 March 2020 

On 20 March, Founder Samuel Dean and Jack Sundt formed a new business, Pricesearcher Technology Group Ltd

Technology 
Pricesearcher uses PriceBot, its custom web crawler, to search the web for prices, and it allows direct product feeds from retailers at no cost. The search engine's rapid growth has been attributed to its enabling technology: a retailer can upload their product feed in any format, without the need for further development. Pricesearcher processes 1.5 billion prices every day and uses Amazon Web Services (AWS), to which it migrated in December 2016, to enable the high volume of data processing required. The rest of the business uses algorithms, NLP, Machine learning, data science and artificial intelligence to organise all the data.

As of February 2018, Pricesearcher is processing 2,500 UK retailers through PriceBot. A further 4,000 retailers are using product feeds to submit product information to the search engine.

Web crawler 

Like Google's web crawler, GoogleBot, PriceBot identifies online retailers and crawls their websites looking for products that are being sold. Retailers can submit their own websites for crawling by PriceBot.

Business model 
Pricesearcher is free to use for both shoppers and retailers. It operates like Google and indeed.com as a free-to-list search engine. Future revenue will come from an Adwords-type advertising model; the most traditional advertising model for search engines

Research 
Data collected by Pricesearcher was presented at the Brighton SEO Conference in a presentation: "What we have learnt from indexing over half a billion products". Using the first 500 million products, Pricesearcher found that the average length of a product title was 48 characters (including spaces). Product descriptions averaged 522 characters, or 90 words. 44.9% included shipping costs. 40.2% did not provide dimensions such as size and colour. Their research shows that many retailers could improve their product listings by using brand terms as product keywords, using GTINs and putting product attributes in separate fields.

Between December 2016 and September 2017, Pricesearcher recorded 4 billion price changes globally. The country with the most price changes was the UK – one every six days.

References

External links

Online companies of the United Kingdom
Product searching websites